Joshua John Ward, of Georgetown County, South Carolina, is known as the largest American slaveholder, dubbed "the king of the rice planters".

In 1850 he held 1,092 slaves; Ward was the largest slaveholder in the United States before his death in 1853. In 1860 his heirs (his estate) held 1,130 or 1,131 slaves.

The Brookgreen Plantation, where he was born and later lived, has been preserved. It was designated as a National Historic Landmark District in 1992. The house and plantation are now part of a park called Brookgreen Gardens.

Family history 
Ward was born November 24, 1800, at his parents' Brookgreen Plantation, South Carolina, the son of Joshua Ward, a planter and banker, and his wife Elizabeth Cook. 

Ward was married March 14, 1825, in South Carolina to Joanna Douglas Hasell. They lived with their family chiefly at Brookgreen Plantation. Ward died there on February 27, 1853.

Career 
Born into the elite planter class, Ward was taught the skills and knowledge for taking on such responsibilities as an adult. He was likely tutored at home as part of his education. During his life, he inherited Brookgreen Plantation and acquired several others. All were used for rice production, which was the major commodity crop in antebellum South Carolina. He also bought more enslaved African Americans as laborers for these plantations. 

He became politically active in the Democratic Party, which was dominated by the planter elite in the antebellum years. Ward was elected as the 44th Lieutenant Governor of South Carolina, serving from 1850 to 1852 under Governor John Hugh Means.

Legacy
Brookgreen Plantation has been preserved as part of Brookgreen Gardens park. The plantation and contributing buildings was designated as a National Historic Landmark District in 1992, after having been listed on the National Register of Historic Places in 1978.

References 

 Ben Horry, Lowcountry Lives

1800 births
1853 deaths
Lieutenant Governors of South Carolina
People from Georgetown, South Carolina
American slave owners
South Carolina Democrats
19th-century American politicians